Major General Archibald Vincent Arnold (February 24, 1889 – January 4, 1973) was a United States Army officer who served during World War II.

Early life and career

Arnold was born in Collinsville, Connecticut on February 24, 1889. He attended United States Military Academy at West Point, where he was an All-American football player. After graduating from West Point in June 1912, Arnold was commissioned into the United States Army Infantry Branch. His fellow graduates included future general officers such as Millard Harmon, Walton Walker, Walter M. Robertson, Wade H. Haislip, Gilbert R. Cook, Stephen J. Chamberlin, John Shirley Wood, Raymond O. Barton, Charles C. Drake, Robert McGowan Littlejohn, Harry J. Malony, Franklin C. Sibert, William H. Wilbur, and Albert E. Brown.

World War II
At the beginning of World War II, Arnold was Chief Staff of the I Corps and commander of the 69th Field Artillery Brigade and 44th Division.

Arnold was the second-in-command of the 7th Infantry Division during the Battle of the Aleutian Islands. Arnold continued serving as second-in-command of the 7th until 1944.

Arnold was the commanding general of the 7th Division during the Philippines Campaign and the Battle of Okinawa. He received the Army Distinguished Service Medal for his World War II service.

After the war, Arnold was made the military governor of Korea from 1945 to 1946. He served as principal American delegate to the US-USSR Joint Committee that convened in Seoul, Korea, in January 1946, and then to the US-USSR Joint Commission that followed in April 1946. The primary task of the Joint Commission was to reunite North and South Korea after it was divided by the State War Navy Coordinating Committee (SWNCC) in 1945. He retired from the Army in 1948.

Personal life
Arnold married Margaret Treat Arnold.

Honors and awards

Distinguished Service Medal

Citation

Citation

Silver Star

Citation

Legion of Merit

Citation

References

External links
Generals of World War II

1889 births
1973 deaths
United States Army Field Artillery Branch personnel
American football centers
United States Army Infantry Branch personnel
Army Black Knights football players
Army Black Knights men's basketball players
Korea–United States relations
Aleutian Islands campaign
Recipients of the Legion of Merit
People from Canton, Connecticut
American men's basketball players
United States Army personnel of World War I
United States Army generals of World War II
United States Army generals
United States Military Academy alumni
Recipients of the Distinguished Service Medal (US Army)
Recipients of the Silver Star
Recipients of the Air Medal